Resource was a German electronic dance production and remix group, consisting of producers Frank Knebel, Henning Reith, Reinhard Raith, and Wolfgang Boss. They released one single in 2003, "(I Just Died) In Your Arms", in three countries (Germany, United Kingdom and Australia) and two other 12" records were later released in Germany. They have also remixed several dance songs.

Discography

Single

Vinyl
"18 Mne Uzhe"
"More Than a Feeling"

Remixes
Flip & Fill - "I Wanna Dance With Somebody"
Phoenix 2003 - "Dreamer"
Adrima - "Rainbowland (Follow Me)"
L'Na - "Urgent"
Coco vs. Jet - "Loving Arms 2003"
Crazy Frog - "Popcorn"

References

External links
Discogs.com discography

German electronic music groups
German record producers
German dance music groups